Tarapunga is:
The Māori language name for the red-billed gull and black-billed gull
HMNZS Tarapunga is a patrol vessel of the Royal New Zealand Navy